Eureka High School may refer to:

In the United States:
Eureka High School (California), Eureka, California
Eureka School, former school including a high school for African Americans in Georgia
Eureka High School (Illinois), Eureka, Illinois
Eureka High School (Kansas), Eureka, Kansas
Eureka High School (Mississippi), former high school for African Americans in Hattiesburg, Mississippi
Eureka High School (Missouri), Eureka, Missouri
Eureka High School (Nevada), Eureka, Nevada
Eureka High School (South Dakota), Eureka, South Dakota